"Living in Another World" is a song by English band Talk Talk. It was recorded for the band's 1986 album The Colour of Spring and was the second single from the album, making the top 40 in Germany, Switzerland, the Netherlands and Flanders.

The track was one of those selected to promote contentious 1991 remix album History Revisited. The artwork for the single was by James Marsh. Hammond organ is played by guest musician Steve Winwood.

Composition
The song has been noted for its cyclical musical structure. Kenny Anderson, aka King Creosote: "I never tire of [the song], and yet I don't quite understand how they managed to make it sound like a musical version of that famous Escher staircase." Songwriter Mark Hollis was inspired by the modal jazz of Miles Davis. In an interview on Italian TV in 1987, Hollis explained that the studies of Jean-Paul Sartre inspired the lyrics.

Artwork
The illustration for the song continued the "moth" theme developed by James Marsh for the Colour of Spring album and singles. It was the only painting in the series to have pre-existed, having been created by Marsh for his first book. It appeared opposite a verse entitled "Tiger Moth".

Music video
A promotional video for "Living in Another World" was directed by long-time collaborator Tim Pope. It features the band being suspended 20ft in the air (shot upside down but filmed the right way round), hanging onto a grand piano whilst a wind machine blows violently in their faces.

Cover versions
"Living in Another World" was covered by Lights featuring Darkstars for the 2012 tribute album Spirit of Talk Talk.

References

External links
 Sleeve design on James Marsh's website
 Lyrics on Google Play Music

Talk Talk songs
1986 singles
1985 songs
Songs written by Mark Hollis (musician)
Songs written by Tim Friese-Greene
Song recordings produced by Tim Friese-Greene
Music videos directed by Tim Pope
Parlophone singles
EMI Records singles